The Grand Prix du Midi Libre (referred to as just Midi Libre) was a multiple-stage road cycling course in the south of France. The race, named after the newspaper that organized it, was first organized in 1949 and was an important preparation courses for the Tour de France. Because of the hills in southern France, a climber usually won but sometimes the decision was made in a flat stage.

In 2003 the course was not organized, due to financial problems. One year later it returned, named Tour du Languedoc-Roussillon, but this turned out to be a one-time comeback.

Winners 

|-style="color:gray"
|2002
|colspan="4"|Result Void

References

Cycle races in France
Recurring sporting events established in 1949
1949 establishments in France
Defunct cycling races in France
Recurring sporting events disestablished in 2004
Men's road bicycle races
2004 disestablishments in France
Super Prestige Pernod races